Beach Clash is a game show that aired in syndication from September 19, 1994, through September 17, 1995.  The show was hosted by David Hirsch and Alison Armitage. Teams of one male player, one female player, and two "hardbodies" competed in beach-themed events in an attempt to win the season's grand prize of $10,000 and a Hawaiian vacation.

References

1994 American television series debuts
1995 American television series endings
First-run syndicated television programs in the United States
1990s American game shows